Jean Marteilhe (1684–1777) was a French huguenot writer. Condemned to the galleys for his belief in 1701 and freed in 1713, he is one of the few former gally slaves to have written a slave narrative.

References 

French memoirists
18th-century French writers
French slaves
People who wrote slave narratives
18th-century slaves
1684 births
1777 deaths
Galley slaves
Huguenots
18th-century memoirists